Armadillo Autoduel Arena is a 1983 supplement for Car Wars published by Steve Jackson Games.

Gameplay
Armadillo Autoduel Arena features the first autoduelling area opened in the U.S., built around an abandoned shopping mall.

Reception
Craig Sheeley reviewed Armadillo Autoduel Arena in Space Gamer No. 67. Sheeley commented that "As a whole, the Armadillo Autoduel Arena is an unusual place to duel, due to interrupted line-of-sight and the necessary gambit of screaming around the central bunker at high speed to see anybody. I find it a welcome break from road dueling. A must for Car Wars fans."

GeekDad wrote that Armadillo Autoduel Arena was "an enclosed arena that would make the old Demolition Derby's look like a pillow fight [...] both 21" x 32" maps combined to create the playing area. I have fond memories of using this map quite a bit because anytime a player's car was totaled but the driver survived, that player would inevitably try to make a run for the center buildings. Key word – 'try.'"

References

Car Wars